Dendrelaphis luzonensis, also known as the Luzon bronzeback, is a species of snake of the family Colubridae.

Geographic range
The snake is found on the island of Luzon in the Philippines.

References 

luzonensis
Snakes of Southeast Asia
Reptiles of the Philippines
Endemic fauna of the Philippines
Fauna of Luzon
Reptiles described in 1961